Aleksandar Olenik (born 1973) is a Serbian politician and a lawyer. A member of the National Assembly, he heads the European Regions parliamentary group.  He is a former president of the Civic Democratic Forum. He also works in the legal team of the Gay Straight Alliance, an organization that fights for the LGBT rights in Serbia.

Biography
He was born in 1973 in Kikinda.

He has worked as a lawyer in several domestic and international organizations, such as the Norwegian Refugee Council, the Danish Refugee Council, Mercy Corps and the Humanitarian Law Center, where he has represented national and religious minorities, Internally displaced persons, refugees and victims of war crimes. He is currently working on similar cases at the Belgrade Center for Minority Rights and the European Roma Rights Center in Budapest. During 2010, he worked at the United Nations Development Programme in Belgrade as a national consultant in charge of analyzing the application of the criminal code in the part that deals with discrimination.

He was a member of the Movement of Free Citizens, in which he had the function of a member of the executive board and the head of the legal team.

After the former president of the movement Saša Janković retired from politics, he ran for president. Soon after Sergej Trifunović was elected to that position.

Olenik and some other members left the Movement of Free Citizens in early 2019, and claimed that they did not leave the movement because of Trifunović, but because of the change in politics.

He was one of the initiators of the founding of the new political organization Civic Democratic Forum, whose president he became at the founding assembly in March 2019.

Views 
Olenik is known for his anti-clerical views and his opposition to the Serbian Orthodox Church and advocates for the abolition of religious education in schools in Serbia, as well as for imposing a "luxury tax" for the Church.

References

External links
Civic Democratic Forum

1973 births
Living people
Politicians from Kikinda
21st-century Serbian lawyers
Movement of Free Citizens (Serbia) politicians
Civic Democratic Forum politicians
Serbian people of Ukrainian descent
Members of the National Assembly (Serbia)